Popwell is a surname. Notable people with the surname include:

 Albert Popwell (1926–1999), American actor
 Little Man Popwell (1912–1966), American poker player
 Robert Popwell (1950–2017), American jazz-funk bass guitarist and percussionist

See also
 Powell (surname)